Devens is a regional enterprise zone and census-designated place in the towns of Ayer and Shirley (in Middlesex County) and Harvard (in Worcester County) in the U.S. state of Massachusetts. It is the successor to Fort Devens, a military post that operated from 1917 to 1996. The population was 1,840 at the 2010 census.

History 

The area itself is named after jurist and Civil War general Charles Devens. In 2011, the CDP tried to secede from Ayer, Shirley, and Harvard and become the 352nd town in the Commonwealth of Massachusetts but failed the vote. Some residents are still looking to secede to become a town.

Military use

The area operated as Camp Devens and later Fort Devens from 1917 to 1996. The Fort's sitting was due primarily to its location at a major hub of the rail network in New England. The U.S. Army was officially closed in 1996 after 79 years of service. Some parcels were retained by the federal military for use as the Devens Reserve Forces Training Area, reactivated as a smaller Fort Devens in 2007.

Civilian use

The process for distribution of surplus land parcels on the former Fort Devens allowed the Federal Bureau of Prisons, Shriver Job Corps, Massachusetts National Guard, Massachusetts Veterans and MassDevelopment to acquire the land.  The Bureau of Prisons established the Federal Medical Center, Devens, a prison hospital. The bulk of the land was purchased by MassDevelopment for $17 million. MassDevelopment is a quasi-public development authority that has been given the task of turning Devens into a residential and business community. Since the closing of the military base, many of the existing buildings have been renovated or reconstructed; housing developments now exist, along with a growing business park, a new hotel, restaurants, two disc golf courses and a golf course. Veterans of the Army Security Agency have also expressed interest in building a museum there, as Fort Devens was their principal training facility for more than two decades.

A comprehensive disposition process has been ongoing since 2003, charged with determining the future political governance of Devens. During 2005-06 it was determined that the governance scenario best suited for the regional stakeholders was to create a new independent town. On October 24, 2006, a vote to confirm the disposition recommendation for future governance was voted down by 2 of the 6 stakeholders, the adjoining towns of Harvard and Ayer (residents of Shirley, the Devens residents, MassDevelopment and the Devens Enterprise Commission supported the resolution). On November 7, 2006 during the State elections the second opportunity to vote on Devens disposition had only Harvard voting against the scenario with the towns of Ayer and Shirley supporting Devens as a town. Devens's disposition will now be determined by another disposition process or by the state legislature. Residents of Devens vote in either Harvard or Ayer but still have no elected representatives that have municipal authority in Devens. MassDevelopment maintains the utilities (such as gas, electricity and water) and contracts out public safety services such as firefighting and police.

Devens is home to, among other enterprises, New England Studios, a film studio opened in 2014  and Commonwealth Fusion Systems, a spinoff of the Massachusetts Institute of Technology which raised $1.8 billion in December, 2021 to build a tokamak fusion device.

Demographics

Government
Devens residents are represented at two levels:
 An elected committee, the Devens Committee. that is an advisory committee to MassDevelopment. The committee has five members with a chair, vice-chair and secretary
 Some residents living outside of Devens proper are represented by the town governments of the Towns of Ayer (northeast) and Harvard (southeast).

Nuclear fusion facility
Commonwealth Fusion Systems, an MIT spinoff, raised $1.8 billion in December, 2021 to build a tokamak fusion device, called SPARC, at a scale intended to achieve “net energy,” that is, it is expected to output more energy than required to sustain its nuclear fusion reactions.  The company is building this facility in Devens. The full-scale machine is planned to be fully operational by 2025.

Education
Devens is a non-operating school district. It currently contracts with the town of Harvard for educating its children. However, Devens is the home of the Francis W. Parker Charter Essential School. Parker is a public charter school with students from about 30 towns in the central Massachusetts area.

Places of interest
With the exception of the U.S. Army Garrison Fort Devens cantonment area, the Devens Reserve Forces Training Area, and the  Federal Medical Center prison, most of the former Fort Devens area has been returned to civilian use.

Of interest to the general public in Devens:
 Oxbow National Wildlife Refuge is located to the south side of the former Fort Devens base.
 Fort Devens Historic District is located to the north of the former Fort Devens.
 The Fort Devens Museum http://fortdevensmuseum.org (94 Jackson Rd, #305) is a small museum on the history of Fort Devens from 1917 to the present

References

External links
 
 Devenscommunity.com, information about the current status of redevelopment in Devens

Census-designated places in Middlesex County, Massachusetts
Census-designated places in Worcester County, Massachusetts
Villages in Middlesex County, Massachusetts
Villages in Worcester County, Massachusetts
Villages in Massachusetts
Census-designated places in Massachusetts